M. R. Madhavan is the President and co-founder of PRS Legislative Research, a public policy research institution that focuses on making the legislative process in India better informed, more transparent and participatory. PRS publishes "legislative briefs" (short commented summaries) of Bills in Lok Sabha and Rajya Sabha and other articles related to legislation in India.

Madhavan holds an undergraduate degree in engineering from IIT Madras and an MBA and PhD from IIM Calcutta. He started his career in ICICI Securities in the equity research group and later headed interest rates research at ICICI. He also worked for Bank of America as a Principal and Senior Strategist for the Asia region.

Madhavan quit Bank of America in September 2005 and joined forces with C. V. Madhukar to open PRS Legislative Research. At PRS, Madhavan set up and led the Research team, before becoming the President of PRS.

Madhavan was honoured with the Distinguished Alumnus Award by IIM Calcutta in 2014. IIT Madras also honoured him with the Distinguished Alumnus Award in 2017. He was selected as the Business Standard Social Entrepreneur of the Year 2019.

References

Indian Institute of Management Calcutta alumni
IIT Madras alumni
Businesspeople from Delhi
Indian chief executives
Living people
1968 births